Jake Zemke (born December 15, 1975 in San Francisco, California) is an American former professional motorcycle road racer of partial Japanese ancestry. He turned pro in 1992.  Zemke's race number has been 98 for most of his racing career. He started his own riding school called Zemke Riding Development.

Chronology

1996 AMA Speedway US National Championship Qualifier
1997 3rd (ST), 66th (AMA Formula Xtreme)
1998 9th (750SS)
1999 52nd (AMA Superbike Championship), 15th (600SS), 2nd (750SS)
2000 8th (600SS), 2nd (AMA Formula Xtreme)
2001 6th (600SS), 47th (750SS), 4th (AMA Formula Xtreme)- Bruce Transportation Honda
2002 8th (AMA Supersport Championship), 2nd (AMA Formula Xtreme)  - Bruce Transportation Honda
2003 5th (AMA Supersport Championship), 3rd (AMA Formula Xtreme)  - Erion Honda
2004 3rd (AMA Superbike Championship), 2nd (AMA Formula Xtreme)  - American Honda Racing
2005 11th (AMA Superbike Championship), 2nd (AMA Formula Xtreme)  - American Honda Racing
2006 7th (AMA Superbike Championship), 33rd (AMA Formula Xtreme)  - American Honda Racing
2007 3rd (AMA Superbike Championship) - American Honda Racing
2008 1st AMA (Formula Xtreme) and 2nd AMA (Supersport) - Erion Honda
2009 6th AMA (Daytona Sportbike) - Erion Honda
2010 3rd AMA (American Superbike) -Released from Michael Jordan Motorsports Suzuki
2011 28th BSB (British EVO Class) - WFR Honda (Fill in Rider)
2012 7th AMA (Daytona SportBike) - Ducshop Ducati
2013 16th AMA (Daytona SportBike) - Riders Discount Racing Triumph (Part-Time)
2014 7th AMA (Daytona SportBike) -Released from GEICO Motorcycles Honda
2015 Retired. Owner of Zemke Riding Development.

Career statistics

EVOLUTION World Championship

AMA

British Evolution Championship

1. – E Denotes riders participating in the Evo class within the British Superbike Championship.

References

External links
Jake Zemke profile at AMAProRacing.com

1975 births
Living people
Racing drivers from San Francisco
American motorcycle racers
AMA Superbike Championship riders
British Superbike Championship riders
Superbike World Championship riders
American sportspeople of Japanese descent